The Conference of Latin Americanist Geographers (CLAG) was formed in 1970 to foster geographic education and research on Latin America. A board of directors governs CLAG. CLAG publishes a Newsletter and the Journal of Latin American Geography. It also operates CLAGNET, an electronic Listserv for members.

The Syracuse University Archives preserve documents and photographs related to the history of the organization because the long-standing Executive Director, David J. Robinson, is a professor at that university.

Awards
Each year CLAG makes several awards to distinguished Latin Americanist geographers and others.

Preston E. James Eminent Latin Americanist Career Award
Carl O. Sauer Distinguished Scholarship Award
Outstanding Service to CLAG
Private Sector and Government Award
Enlaces Award

CLAG also makes awards to graduate students to support research and conference travel.

Conferences
CLAG organizes a conference on a regular basis. The conference typically takes place in the Americas but in 2001 met in Benicassim, Spain.

References

External links 
The official CLAG website
Syracuse University Archives

Geography organizations